The Institute of Engineering Education Taiwan (literally Chinese Institute of Engineering Education) is a non-profit, non-governmental; organization committed to accreditation of engineering and technology education programs in Taiwan.

See also
 Education in Taiwan

External links
 -Institute of Engineering Education Taiwan Official Website.
 -Accreditation Board of Engineering and Technology, Inc.
 -Washington Accord.

School accreditors
Non-profit organizations based in Taiwan